The Men's individual table tennis – Class 5 tournament at the 2020 Summer Paralympics in Tokyo took place during 25–29 August 21 at Tokyo Metropolitan Gymnasium. Classes 1–5 were for athletes with a physical impairment that affected their legs, and who competed in a sitting position. The lower the number, the greater the impact the impairment was on an athlete's ability to compete.

In the preliminary stage, athletes competed in four groups of three. Winners and runners-up of each group qualified for the knock-out stage. In this edition of the Games, no bronze medal match was held. Losers of each semifinal were automatically awarded a bronze medal.

Results
All times are local time in UTC+9.

Main bracket

Final rounds

Preliminary round

Group A

Group B

Group C

Group D

References

Men's individual - Class 5